This rivalry is between Recto's San Sebastian and Muralla's Letran.

The Knights became the first 4th seed to upset the 1st seed in the Final Four when they defeated the Stags twice during the 1999 NCAA Final Four. That feat would soon be duplicated the following year when the 4th seed Stags upended top seed JRC Heavy Bombers in the 2000 NCAA Final Four. The Knights went on to win the 1999 NCAA championship.

Head-to-head record by sport

Seniors' Division

General Championship
Letran leads the General Championship race with 9–4.
Letran (9) - 1979–80, 1997–98, 1998–99, 1999–2000, 2000–01, 2001–02, 2002–03, 2003–04, 2009–10
San Sebastian (4) - 1984–85, 1988–89, 1989–90, 1994–95

Juniors' Division

General Championship
Letran leads the general championship race with 7-6.
Letran (7) - 1983, 1986, 1987, 1998, 1999, 2000, 2001
San Sebastian (6) - 2005, 2006, 2009, 2010, 2011, 2012

Basketball Statistics

Men's basketball results
Both teams are expected to meet at least 2 times per year.

Juniors' Basketball Results

Final Four rankings
For comparison, these are the rankings of these two teams since the Final Four format was introduced.

Seniors' division

Juniors' division

See also
San Sebastian Stags
National Collegiate Athletic Association (Philippines)
San Beda–Letran rivalry
San Beda–San Sebastian rivalry
Battle of Intramuros

References

External links
NCAA historical results
NCAA Season 85 Schedules and Results
NCAA Season 86 Schedules and Results
Google News Archive
Manila Bulletin Online Newspaper Archive
The LANCE - Letran College

National Collegiate Athletic Association (Philippines) rivalries
Colegio de San Juan de Letran
San Sebastian College – Recoletos